J-PAS (Javalambre Physics of the Accelerating universe Astrophysical Survey) is an astronomical survey to be carried out by the Observatorio Astrofísico de Javalambre (OAJ), located in Pico del Buitre in Sierra de Javalambre, near Teruel, in Spain. OAJ is constituted of two telescopes: a 2.5-metre primary mirror telescope (JST/T250) and an 80-centimeter telescope (JAST/T80). J-PAS will survey the sky in 56 colors with JST/T250 telescope and a large field 1.2 Giga-pixel camera, constituted by an array of 14 CCDs. J-PAS will observe more than 8000 square degrees (about 1/5 of the whole sky) during 5/6 years. J-PAS filters cover the entire visible region of the electromagnetic spectrum (3500 Å to 10000 Å).

References

External links 
 Official website

Astronomical observatories in Spain
Optical telescopes